Drug and Chemical Toxicology is a bimonthly peer-reviewed medical journal that publishes full-length research papers, review articles, and short communications that encompass a broad spectrum of toxicological data surrounding risk assessment and harmful exposure. It is published by Taylor & Francis and the editor in chief is Marc A. Williams.

According to the Journal Citation Reports, the journal has a 2020 impact factor of 3.356.

References

External links

Publications established in 1978
Toxicology journals
Taylor & Francis academic journals
English-language journals
Bimonthly journals